Chevone Omille Marsh (born 25 February 1994) is a Jamaican footballer who plays wing/attacking midfielder for Chattanooga Red Wolves in USL League One.

Early life
Marsh grew up in John's Lane, an inner city community off Manninghills Road. He is the third of five brothers and attended Constant Spring Primary and Junior High School. Chevone has been singing and playing the drums since his days in the choir, having first received vocal training from his older sister who always encouraged him to pursue his dream. He passed his GSAT exams for Calabar High School. Although it was a tough neighbourhood, it provided good sports facilities. At 12 he met the Cavalier FC manager who recruited him.

Career

Junior career
Marsh started his career at Cavalier FC at the under-13 level where he helped them to the quarter final. He played for Meadhaven United and went in the age of 15 return to Cavalier, who played in the under-15 and under-17 team simultaneously. They won the KSAFA U-15 that year  winning the KSAFA U-17 the next year. At Cavalier, he helped them to win the KSAFA U-17 where he was named. MVPof the tournament. In 2012, he played for Calabar High at the Manning Cup level, helping them to reach the quarterfinals. The same year he scored the winning goal for Cavalier F.C. to seal their promotion to the top league.

Senior career

Cavalier
He played for Cavalier in the Jamaica National Premier League in the 2012-13 season.

Kokkolan Palloveikot
In April 2016 Marsh went on a trial stint in Finland which sparks controversy with the then Jamaica national team coach Winfried "Winnie" Schäfer who wanted marsh for a friendly international with Chile. Marsh apoted to go to Finland and sign with Kokkolan Palloveikot in the Finnish Ykkönen league.

Chalatenango

In January 2021, Marsh joined Chalatenango in El Salvador.

A.D.R. Jicaral

In July 2021, Marsh moved to Costa Rica and signed with A.D.R. Jicaral.

Chattanooga Red Wolves
Marsh joined USL League One side Chattanooga Red Wolves on 18 January 2023.

International career 
Marsh was in the national under 20 training squad for the under 20 World Cup in Turkey. Marsh represented Jamaica in under 20s qualifiers in Mexico, Jamaica did not qualify but Marsh scored their only goal at the tournament.

Marsh is in the Jamaican squad for WCF qualifiers against Costa Rica for the 2018 World Cup in Russia.  Marsh made his senior national team debut on 7 October versus Saudi Arabia in Jeedah.

International goals
Scores and results list Jamaica's goal tally first.

Honours
 KSAFA U-15 
 KSAFA U-17 
 KSAFA Super League

References

1994 births
Living people
Jamaican footballers
Sportspeople from Kingston, Jamaica
Cavalier F.C. players
Ventura County Fusion players
USL League Two players
Kokkolan Palloveikot players
Ykkönen players
Jamaican expatriate footballers
Expatriate soccer players in the United States
Expatriate footballers in Finland
Jamaica international footballers
Copa América Centenario players
National Premier League players
Association football midfielders
Jamaican expatriate sportspeople in the United States
Jamaican expatriate sportspeople in Finland
Expatriate footballers in Costa Rica
Jamaican expatriate sportspeople in Costa Rica
Expatriate footballers in El Salvador
Jamaican expatriate sportspeople in El Salvador
Chattanooga Red Wolves SC players